Lopker is a surname. Notable people with the surname include:

Karl F. Lopker (1951–2018), American businessman
Pamela Lopker, American businesswoman

See also
Locker (surname)